The Roman Catholic Archdiocese of Madang is  a Metropolitan Archdiocese in Papua New Guinea with suffragan dioceses of Aitape, Lae, Vanimo and Wewak.

The Archdiocese was created in 1966 when it was elevated from a predecessor see.

The Metropolitan Archbishop of Madang, appointed by Pope Francis on 26 July 2019, is the former Bishop of Kundiawa, Papua New Guinea, Anton Bal. He succeeded Archbishop Stephen Joseph Reichert, O.F.M. Cap., whose resignation was accepted after he reached the age limit.

Coat of arms
The proposed coat of arms was created by Marek Sobola, a heraldic specialist from Slovakia, who also made a redesign of coat of arms for the archbishop Stephen Joseph Reichert, O.F.M. Cap.

Bishops

Archbishops of Madang (and Ordinaries of predecessor sees)
Everardo Limbrock, S.V.D. (1896-1914)
Francesco Wolf, S.V.D. (1922-1944)
Stephen A. Appelhans, S.V.D. (1948-1951)
Adolph Alexander Noser, S.V.D. (1953-1975)
Leo Clement Andrew Arkfeld, S.V.D. (1975-1987)
Benedict To Varpin (1987-2001) 
William Joseph Kurtz, S.V.D. (2001-2010) - presently Archbishop Emeritus
Stephen Joseph Reichert, O.F.M. Cap. (2010-2019), a Capuchin - presently Archbishop Emeritus
Anton Bal (2019-present); former Bishop of the Roman Catholic Diocese of Kundiawa, Papua New Guinea

Coadjutor archbishops
Benedict To Varpin (1987)
William Joseph Kurtz, S.V.D. (1999-2001)

References

External links

A
1896 establishments in Oceania
1896 establishments in the German colonial empire